Anjan KC (Nepali: अन्जन के.सी; born 14 December 1986 in Lalitpur, Nepal) is a footballer from Nepal. He played for Nepal national football team between 2005 and 2009. KC has appeared in 2 FIFA World Cup qualifying matches for Nepal during the first round of 2008 Asian qualifiers.

Match fixing allegations 
On 14 October 2015 KC, along with Nepali national football team players Sandip Rai, Sagar Thapa, Ritesh Thapa were arrested by the Nepal Police on suspicion that the group was responsible for match-fixing at the domestic and international level.

References 

Nepal international footballers
Three Star Club players
Nepalese footballers
1986 births
Living people
People from Lalitpur District, Nepal
Association footballers not categorized by position